California's dead sea may refer to;

 Mono Lake, in Mono County, California
 Salton Sea, in California's Imperial and Riverside counties